"All This Time Still Falling Out of Love" is a song by British synthpop duo Erasure.  The track appears on the band's eleventh studio album Nightbird and Mute Records released it together with "Here I Go Impossible Again" (also from Nightbird) as a double A-side, the third single release from this album.

The song was written and produced by Erasure members Vince Clarke and Andy Bell.  "All This Time Still Falling Out of Love" is a straight up dance music number displaying Clarke's signature syncopated, analogue synth noises and rhythm patterns.  The song's original mix, by Tom Elmhirst, appeared as its single version; on Nightbird, it was the one song not to have been mixed by Elmhirst, instead appearing as a harsher dance remix by Vince Clarke and Mark Saunders, who had mixed much of Erasure's early material.  In addition, the DVD single contained a live version.

It was performed frequently during Erasure's 2005 world tour to support Nightbird ("The Erasure Show").  The double A-sided single peaked at number twenty-five on the UK singles chart, becoming Erasure's thirty-first UK Top 40 single.

Track listings

CD single #1 (CDMUTE344)
 "Here I Go Impossible Again" (Single Mix)
 "All This Time Still Falling Out of Love" (Original Mix)

CD single #2 (LCDMUTE344)
 "All This Time Still Falling Out of Love" (Shanghai  Club Mix)
 "Here I Go Impossible Again" (Triggertrax Extended Remix)
 "Here I Go Impossible Again" (Meloboy's Nü-German Compu-Soul Remix)
 CD-ROM: "Here I Go Impossible Again" (PC Digimpro Remix Software)

DVD single (DVDMUTE344)
 "All This Time Still Falling Out of Love" (Album Version)
 "Here I Go Impossible Again" (Pocket Orchestra Club Mix)
 Video: "All This Time Still Falling Out Of Love" (Live in Cologne)

Digital Downloads
 (iMUTE344) "Here I Go Impossible Again" (Single Mix)
 (iMUTE344) "All This Time Still Falling Out of Love" (Original Mix)
 (LiMUTE344) "All This Time Still Falling Out Of Love" (Shanghai  Club Mix)
 (LiMUTE344) "Here I Go Impossible Again" (Triggertrax Extended Remix)
 (LiMUTE344) "Here I Go Impossible Again" (Meloboy's Nü-German Compu-Soul Remix)
 (XLiMUTE344) "All This Time Still Falling Out of Love" (Album Version)
 (XLiMUTE344) "Here I Go Impossible Again" (Pocket Orchestra Club Mix)
 (XXLiMUTE344) "All This Time Still Falling Out Of Love" (Shanghai  Radio Edit)

Chart performance

References 

2005 singles
Erasure songs
Songs written by Vince Clarke
Songs written by Andy Bell (singer)
2005 songs
Mute Records singles

es:Here I Go Impossible Again / All This Time Still Falling Out of Love